Manfred Weidmann (born January 15, 1945) is a German former football player. He spent 8 seasons in the Bundesliga with VfB Stuttgart.

External links
 

German footballers
VfB Stuttgart players
1945 births
Living people
SpVgg Ludwigsburg players
Bundesliga players
Association football midfielders